The 2001–02 Divizia B was the 62nd season of the second tier of the Romanian football league system.

The format has been changed from two series of 18 teams to two series, each of them having 16 teams. At the end of the season, the winners of the series promoted to Divizia A and the last four places from both series relegated to Divizia C. A promotion play-off was played between the 13th and 14th-placed in the Divizia A and the runners-up of the Divizia B series.

Team changes

To Divizia B
Promoted from Divizia C
 Petrolul Moinești
 Dacia Unirea Brăila
 Inter Gaz București
 Electromagnetica București
 Internațional Pitești
 Minaur Zlatna
 IS Câmpia Turzii
 Universitatea Cluj

Relegated from Divizia A
 Foresta Fălticeni
 Rocar București
 Gaz Metan Mediaș

From Divizia B
Relegated to Divizia C
 Metrom Brașov
 Apemin Borsec
 Drobeta-Turnu Severin
 Corvinul Hunedoara
 Callatis Mangalia
 Electro Craiova
 Juventus București
 FCM Râmnicu Vâlcea
 Precizia Săcele
 Cetate Deva
 Politehnica Iași
 Inter Sibiu

Promoted to Divizia A
 Sportul Studențesc
 UM Timișoara
 Farul Constanța

Other
Electromagnetica București started to be the second squad of Rapid București.

Metalul Plopeni started to be the second squad of Astra Ploiești.

Renamed teams
Fulgerul Bragadiru was renamed as AEK București.

League map

League tables

Seria I

Seria II

Divizia A play-off
The 13th and 14th-placed teams of the Divizia A faced the 2nd-placed teams of the Divizia B.

|}

Top scorers 

18 goals
  Zoltán Csehi (Bihor Oradea)

12 goals
  Daniel Stan (Internațional Pitești)

11 goals
  Alexandru Bălțoi (Poiana Câmpina)

10 goals
  Remus Safta (AEK București)

9 goals
  Marius Safta (ARO Câmpulung)

8 goals
  Virgil Lăscărache (Inter Gaz București)
  Claudiu Boaru (Gaz Metan Mediaș)
  Marius Păcurar (Foresta Suceava)
  Marius Bilașco (Baia Mare)

7 goals
  Mihai Ilie (Cimentul Fieni)
  Viorel Dinu (Electromagnetica București)
  Constantin Romeo Stancu (AEK București)
  Radu Neguț (IS Câmpia Turzii)

See also 
2001–02 Divizia A

References

External links
RomanianSoccer.ro

Liga II seasons
Rom
2001–02 in Romanian football